Andrey Olegovich Yeshchenko (born 9 February 1984) is a Russian professional football official and a former player who played as a right-back.

Career 

Yeshchenko became famous appearing in a short spell for FC Dynamo Kyiv in 2006. Although considered a first team player throughout his entire stay in Kyiv, Yeshchenko complained of difficulties adhering to the strict physical regime at Dynamo. In turn, Dynamo management loaned the back to its fellow Muscovite club. He made his Russian Premier League debut for FC Dynamo Moscow on 4 August 2006 in a game against FC Torpedo Moscow.

In October 2012 he was voted FC Lokomotiv Moscow player of the month.

On 1 July 2014, Yeshchenko signed for Kuban Krasnodar on a season-long loan deal with the option to buy.

On 16 June 2016, he signed with FC Spartak Moscow.

Career statistics

International career

He made his national team debut on 11 September 2012 in a 2014 FIFA World Cup qualifier against Israel.

On 2 June 2014, he was included in Russia's 2014 FIFA World Cup squad.

Honours
Dynamo Kyiv
Ukrainian Cup: 2005–06
Ukrainian Super Cup: 2006

Spartak Moscow
Russian Premier League: 2016–17
Russian Super Cup: 2017

References

External links 
Dynamo Kyiv Player Profile

1984 births
Living people
Sportspeople from Irkutsk
Russian people of Ukrainian descent
Russian footballers
Association football defenders
Russia under-21 international footballers
Russia international footballers
FC Zvezda Irkutsk players
FC Khimki players
FC Dynamo Kyiv players
FC Dynamo Moscow players
FC Dnipro players
FC Arsenal Kyiv players
FC Volga Nizhny Novgorod players
FC Lokomotiv Moscow players
FC Anzhi Makhachkala players
FC Kuban Krasnodar players
FC Spartak Moscow players
Russian Premier League players
Russian First League players
Russian Second League players
Ukrainian Premier League players
Ukrainian First League players
Russian expatriate footballers
Expatriate footballers in Ukraine
Russian expatriate sportspeople in Ukraine
2014 FIFA World Cup players